The 1997–98 British National League season was the second season of the British National League, the second level of ice hockey in Great Britain. 10 teams participated in the league, and the Guildford Flames won the championship.

First round

Northern Pool

Southern Pool

National Pool

Playoffs

Quarterfinals

Group A

Group B

Semifinals 
 Guildford Flames - Telford Tigers 5:3
 Kingston Hawks - Fife Flyers 7:3

Final 
 Kingston Hawks - Guildford Flames 1:5

External links 
 Season on hockeyarchives.info

British National League (1996–2005) seasons
United
2